Gommerville is the name of the following communes in France:

 Gommerville, Eure-et-Loir, in the Eure-et-Loir department
 Gommerville, Seine-Maritime, in the Seine-Maritime department